Limerick West was a parliamentary constituency represented in Dáil Éireann, the lower house of the Irish parliament or Oireachtas from 1948 to 2011. The constituency elected 3 deputies (Teachtaí Dála, commonly known as TDs). The method of election was proportional representation by means of the single transferable vote (PR-STV).

History and boundaries 
The constituency was created under the Electoral (Amendment) Act 1947 for the 1948 general election. It succeeded the constituency of Limerick, which was divided between Limerick West and Limerick East. It was located in the western and southern part of County Limerick. It was a rural constituency, including the towns of Abbeyfeale, Askeaton, Newcastle West and Rathkeale.

In some elections, such as in 1981 and 1982, only Fianna Fáil and Fine Gael candidates appeared on the ballot. A Progressive Democrats candidate was elected in 1987; this was the only time a candidate from a party other than Fianna Fáil or Fine Gael was elected in the constituency. No candidate from a left-wing party was ever elected there.

At the 2011 general election the constituency was replaced by the constituencies of Limerick and Kerry North–West Limerick. The western part of the constituency became part of Kerry North–West Limerick, while the remainder, along with most of the rural parts of Limerick East, was transferred to the Limerick constituency.

TDs

Elections

2007 general election

2002 general election 
In the final count Dan Neville beat Michael Finucane by only one vote to win the last seat.

1997 general election

1992 general election

1989 general election

1987 general election

November 1982 general election

February 1982 general election

1981 general election

1977 general election

1973 general election

1969 general election

1967 by-election 
Following the death of Fianna Fáil TD James Collins, a by-election was held on 9 November 1967. The seat was won by the Fianna Fáil candidate Gerry Collins, son of the deceased TD.

1965 general election

1961 general election

1957 general election

1955 by-election 
Following the death of Fine Gael TD David Madden, a by-election was held on 13 December 1955. The seat was won by the Fianna Fáil candidate Michael Colbert.

1954 general election

1951 general election

1948 general election

See also 
Dáil constituencies
Politics of the Republic of Ireland
List of political parties in the Republic of Ireland
List of Dáil by-elections
Elections in the Republic of Ireland

References

External links 
Oireachtas Members Database

Historic constituencies in County Limerick
Dáil constituencies in the Republic of Ireland (historic)
1948 establishments in Ireland
2011 disestablishments in Ireland
Constituencies established in 1948
Constituencies disestablished in 2011